Calcium-binding tyrosine phosphorylation-regulated protein is a protein that in humans is encoded by the CABYR gene.

To reach fertilization competence, spermatozoa undergo a series of morphological and molecular maturational processes, termed capacitation, involving protein tyrosine phosphorylation and increased intracellular calcium. The protein encoded by this gene localizes to the principal piece of the sperm flagellum in association with the fibrous sheath and exhibits calcium-binding when phosphorylated during capacitation. A pseudogene on chromosome 3 has been identified for this gene. Transcript variants of this gene encode multiple protein isoforms. An additional transcript and isoform has not been fully characterized.

References

External links

Further reading